Mark Cantoni is a former rugby league footballer for the Pia Donkeys in the Elite One Championship and Northern Pride in the Queensland Cup rugby league football competition. He has represented the Queensland Country side and the United States national rugby league team. His position is at second row. Nicknamed Yank, as he played with  the USA international Rugby League Team.

References

1979 births
Living people
Australian expatriate rugby league players
Australian expatriate sportspeople in France
Australian people of American descent
Australian people of Italian descent
Australian rugby league players
Baroudeurs de Pia XIII players
Expatriate rugby league players in France
Northern Pride RLFC players
Rugby league second-rows
United States national rugby league team players